Blank space may refer to:
Space (punctuation), a blank area devoid of content used to separate characters in writing
Whitespace character, any character that represents a space in typography
"Blank Space", a song by Taylor Swift
"Blank Space", a song by Tanya Chua nominated for the Best Composer award at the 19th Golden Melody Awards

See also
Blank (disambiguation)
Empty space (disambiguation), an unoccupied area or volume
Space (disambiguation)
White space (visual arts), white unmarked space within art